The Iglesia de Santiago is a Catholic church and parish in Gáldar, Gran Canaria, Canary Islands, Spain. The present building in neoclassical style was built from 1778 to 1826. It is dedicated to James the Apostle.

References

External links 
 

Roman Catholic churches in the Canary Islands
Roman Catholic churches completed in 1826